Donald Graham Hill (1 November 1938 – 24 August 2005) was a judge that served on the Federal Court of Australia.  He was prominent in the field of taxation law.

References 

1938 births
2005 deaths
Judges of the Federal Court of Australia